Leonardo Benevolo (25 September 1923 – 5 January 2017) was an Italian architect, city planner and architecture  historian. Born in Orta San Giulio, Italy, Benevolo studied architecture in Rome where he graduated in 1946. Later taught history of architecture in Rome, Florence, Venice and Palermo. His book Storia dell'archittetura moderna (History of Modern Architecture) first published in 1960 has been reprinted 18 times, as of 1996, and translated into six other languages. Benevolo developed the concept of ‘neo-conservative’ city which became an important contribution to the understanding of cities’ evolution.

Writings
1967 The origins of Modern Town Planning, MIT Press
1977 History of Modern Architecture, MIT Press
1980 The History of the City, MIT Press
1995 The European City, Wiley-Blackwell

References

1923 births
2017 deaths
20th-century Italian architects
Italian architectural historians
Italian male non-fiction writers
People from Orta San Giulio
Historians of urban planning